In enzymology, a pterin deaminase is an enzyme that catalyzes the chemical reaction

2-amino-4-hydroxypteridine + H2O  2,4-dihydroxypteridine + NH3

Thus, the two substrates of this enzyme are 2-amino-4-hydroxypteridine and H2O, whereas its two products are 2,4-dihydroxypteridine and NH3.

This enzyme belongs to the family of hydrolases, those acting on carbon-nitrogen bonds other than peptide bonds, specifically in cyclic amidines.  The systematic name of this enzyme class is 2-amino-4-hydroxypteridine aminohydrolase. This enzyme is also called acrasinase.

References

 
 

EC 3.5.4
Enzymes of unknown structure